Ion Ciubuc (29 May 1943 – 29 January 2018) was an economist and a Moldovan politician who served as the 3rd Prime Minister of Moldova from January 1997 to February 1999.

Biography
Ion Ciubuc was born on 29 May 1943 in the village of Hădărăuţi (today in Ocniţa district). He graduated from the Agricultural Institute in Odessa in 1970, obtaining the qualification of a specialist in the agrarian economy. He subsequently obtained his Ph.D. in economics.

He initially worked as an economist at the "1 Mai" Colhoz in the village of Hădărăuţi (1960–1963), after which he satisfied his compulsory military service in the Soviet Army (1963–1966).  Returned to Moldavian SSR, he is appointed chief economist and president of the colhoz in the villages of Hădărăuţi and Trebisăuți (1966–1973), then chairman of the Colhoz Council of the Briceni district (1973–1975).

He is sent to a political training course, organized by the Academy of Social Sciences of the Central Committee of the Communist Party of the Soviet Union, after which he becomes an instructor of PCM in the city of Chisinau (1975–1976). He was then transferred to Moscow as an auditor at the Academy of Sciences of the CC of the PCU (1976–1978). He returned to Moldavian SSR, being appointed as first secretary of the Vulcănești District Committee, of the Communist Party of the Moldavian SSR(1978–1984).

He worked between 1960 and 1984 in various positions in several economic units and state institutions. Between 1984 and 1986 he was First Deputy Chairman of the State Planning Committee (Gosplan) of Moldavian SSR. Then, from 1986 to 1989, he worked as head of the Agricultural Research Department from the Institute of Scientific Research in the field of Agriculture in Moldavian SSR. Until 1990, he held the position of vice-president of agro-industrial complex of Moldavian SSR.

He died in 2018, aged 74.

References

 

1943 births
2018 deaths
People from Ocnița District
Prime Ministers of Moldova
Recipients of the Order of Work Glory